Emmalocera tenuicostella is a species of snout moth in the genus Emmalocera. It was described by Émile Louis Ragonot in 1888. It is found in western Africa.

References

Moths described in 1888
Emmalocera